"Latina" is a song recorded by Colombians singers Reykon featuring Maluma. It was released by Warner Latina on May 31, 2019. A remix version with Becky G and Tyga was released on October 9, 2020.

Music video
The music video was released on May 31, 2019.

Charts

Certifications

References

2019 singles
2019 songs
Maluma songs
Becky G songs
Tyga songs